Tronador - Villa Ortúzar is a station on Line B of the Buenos Aires Underground. The station was opened on 9 August 2003 as part of the extension of the line between Federico Lacroze and Los Incas - Parque Chas.

It is located in the Villa Ortuzar barrio, at the intersection of Avenida Triunvirato and Calle Tronador, and named after the latter and the neighbourhood the station is in.

References

External links

Buenos Aires Underground stations
Railway stations opened in 2003
2003 establishments in Argentina